Ab Kya Hoga is a supernatural-thriller 1977 Hindi movie, produced, directed and written by Sawan Kumar Tak.  The film stars Shatrughan Sinha, Neetu Singh, Asrani, Bindu, Moushumi Chatterjee and Ranjeet. The film's music is by Tak's wife Usha Khanna.

It was a rare movie of olden times where actor  Ranjeet played a non-villain role, whereas noted comedy actor Asrani played a negative role who plans the hero's death.  Most of the past is copied from the 1964 Manoj Kumar-starrer Raj Khosla movie Woh Kaun Thi?.

Cast
 Shatrughan Sinha as Ram Sinha
 Neetu Singh as Chitralekha
 Asrani as Rajesh
 Pinchoo Kapoor
 Chand Usmani
 Indrani Mukherjee
 Mahavir Shah as Driver
 Shahnaz Vahanvaty
 Bindu
 Moushumi Chatterjee
 Jankidas
 Vinod Mehra
 Ranjeet
 Mac Mohan

Plot
The story revolves around Ram Sinha, who meets a girl named Chitralekha while on a train journey. She disappears suddenly from a moving train and thereafter he meets her on various occasions, in circumstances that make him believe that she is a spirit or a ghost. He then discovers that his mother has fixed his marriage with the same girl, and though he goes through with the ceremony, he refuses to accept her as his wife. Chitralekha's ghost/spirit leads him to various life-threatening situations, from which he escapes. Eventually, Ram is killed in a jeep accident, after which it is revealed that his best friend Rajesh had conspired behind his back to cheat him of his wealth. The ghost was a well tutored accomplice who wore a mask that made her look like his betrothed and poisoned Ram's mind against her. The final denouement comes when Ram reappears and reveals that he had faked his death with the help of the Police and his doctor, so as to bring the culprits to the book.

Soundtrack

References

External links
 

1977 films
1970s Hindi-language films
Films scored by Usha Khanna
Films directed by Saawan Kumar Tak
Hindi-language thriller films